Sunbash (Sönbaş) is a rural locality (a selo) in Nureyevsky Selsoviet, Sharansky District, Bashkortostan, Russia. The population was 51 as of 2010. There is 1 street.

Geography 
Sunbash is located 31 km east of Sharan (the district's administrative centre) by road. Tugaryak is the nearest rural locality.

References 

Rural localities in Sharansky District